"Twisted" is a song by American singer Keith Sweat, released as a single in June 1996. It was the first song released from his self-titled fifth album. R&B group Kut Klose and remix rapper Pretty Russ are also featured on the song. The radio version of "Twisted" omits Pretty Russ' rap before the final chorus, though some urban stations kept the rap verse. A second mix of the song, referred to as the Flavahood Sexual remix, features a different backbeat sampled from Marvin Gaye's song "Sexual Healing". "Flavahood" also saw significant airplay on radio but was never released on an album.

Commercially, "Twisted" spent three weeks at No. 1 on the US Billboard Hot R&B Singles chart and peaked at No. 2 on the Billboard Hot 100, becoming Sweat's biggest hit. "Twisted" also peaked at No. 1 on the Billboard Rhythmic Top 40, staying there for 14 consecutive weeks, the most amongst any song except TLC's "No Scrubs", which spent 15 weeks at the top position. Outside the US, "Twisted" topped the New Zealand Singles Chart for six weeks and became a top-20 hit in Australia and the Netherlands. In 2012, VH1 ranked the song at number 35 on their list of the "40 Greatest R&B Songs of the '90s".

Music video

A music video released for the song features Sweat as a homicide detective pursuing a female suspect who assassinated a police commissioner. The video was directed by Paul Hunter.

Keith is a homicide detective first seen at a royal party but the party is interrupted when an unidentified killer shoots a man of Chinese royalty and steals diamonds from him. The killer escapes and is revealed to be a woman. Keith later arrests the woman but as he steps out of his car she manages to escape. As he returns to his apartment, the woman appears awaiting, with her handcuffs off and proceeds to seduce him. Keith is clearly "twisted" as he is unable to emotionally apprehend her.

The woman is now on the run and had made her way to the roof of a building but on her way up the ladder she is stopped and Keith is called to the scene. (The music cuts out) Keith orders them not to shoot, but when he turns his back the woman draws a gun but before she can fire the weapon an unidentified cop shoots the woman. (The music is continued) Sweat looks on at her as she is left hanging from the ladder, dead. Flashbacks of their encounters occur while he stands watching her in the rain before the video ends. The music video premiered the week of June 9, 1996

Track listings

US CD single
 "Twisted" (album version)
 "Twisted" (Flavahood Sexual Remix)
 "Twisted" (Sweat Shop Party Remix)
 Album excerpts: "Chocolate Girl"/"Funky Dope Lovin'"/"Just a Touch"
 "Twisted" (album version instrumental)
 "Twisted" (a cappella)

US cassette single
A. "Twisted" (radio version)
B. Album excerpts: "Chocolate Girl"/"Funky Dope Lovin'"/"Just a Touch"

UK and Australian CD single
 "Twisted" (radio version with rap) – 4:10
 "Twisted" (Flavahood Sexual remix) – 5:03
 "Twisted" (Sweat Shop Party remix edit w/o rap) – 4:12
 "Twisted" (Flavahood Sexual remix edit w/o rap) – 4:01
 "Twisted" (Flavahood Sexual instrumental) – 5:03
 "Twisted" (a cappella) – 4:33

Charts

Weekly charts

Year-end charts

Decade-end charts

Certifications

Release history

See also
 R&B number-one hits of 1996 (USA)

References

1990s ballads
1996 songs
1996 singles
Contemporary R&B ballads
Hip hop soul songs
Keith Sweat songs
Music videos directed by Paul Hunter (director)
Number-one singles in New Zealand
Songs written by Athena Cage
Songs written by Keith Sweat
Songs written by Marvin Gaye